Mary Camacho Torres is a Guamanian politician. Torres serves as a Republican senator in the Guam Legislature.

Early life 
Torres was born in Tamuning, Guam. Torres' father was Carlos Garcia Camacho (1924-1979), a dentist and the first elected governor of Guam. Torres' mother is Lourdes Perez Camacho, former First Lady of Guam. Torres graduated from Academy of Our Lady of Guam, an all-girls Catholic high school.

Education 
Torres earned a Bachelor of Arts degree from Tufts University in Massachusetts.

Career 
In February 2012, Torres was appointed as the General Manager of the Port Authority of Guam.

On November 4, 2014, Torres won the election and became a Republican senator in the Guam Legislature. Torres began her term on January 5, 2015 in the 33rd Guam Legislature. Torres also served as the Minority Whip.

On November 8, 2016, as an incumbent, Torres won the election and continued serving as a senator in the 34th Guam Legislature.

On November 5, 2018, as an incumbent, Torres won the election and continued serving as a senator in the 35th Guam Legislature.

On November 2, 2020, as an incumbent, Torres won the election and continued serving as a senator in the 36th Guam Legislature.

Personal life 
Torres' husband is Robert Torres, a Chief Justice. They have three children. Torres and her family live in Sånta Rita-Sumai, Guam.

References

External links 
 Mary Torres at ballotpedia.org
 Mary Camacho Torres at ourcampaigns.com
 Mary Camacho Torres at rutgers.edu

Guamanian Republicans
Guamanian women in politics
Living people
Members of the Legislature of Guam
Year of birth missing (living people)